Maryborough East or East Maryborough is a barony in County Laois (formerly called Queen's County or County Leix), Ireland.

Etymology
Maryborough is the former name of the town of Portlaoise, established in 1548 and named after Queen Mary I; it was given its current name in 1929.

Geography
Maryborough East is located in central County Laois.

History

Maryborough East and West were in the Middle Ages the land of the Cinel Crimthann, an Irish clan with the surname Ó Duibh (Duffy or O'Diff).

It is referred to in the topographical poem Tuilleadh feasa ar Éirinn óigh (Giolla na Naomh Ó hUidhrín, d. 1420): 
Fa Dún Mascc as mín fuinn,
O'Duib for Chenel cCrioṁṫainn,
Triath an tíre fa ṫoraḋ,
Iath as míne measrogaḋ.
("Under Dun Masc of smooth land, O'Duibh is over Cinel-Criomthainn, Lord of the territory which is under fruit, Land of smoothest mast-fruit.")

Maryborough was originally a single barony; it was divided into East and West before 1807.

List of settlements

Below is a list of settlements in Maryborough East barony:
Portlaoise

References

Baronies of County Laois